The Pyongyang Folklore Park was an amusement park located in Pyongyang, North Korea, at the foot of Mount Taesong. It was built with a historical theme, and construction began in December 2008. There are also folk parks in Sukchon, South Pyongan Province and Sariwon, North Hwanghae Province. South Korean folk parks with an historical theme such as Korean Folk Village are popular attractions.
Tourists rarely visited the park. When tourists did visit, they were usually part of organized tours. The park was shut down for renovations in June 2016. News reports speculated that the facility reminded Kim Jong-un of his uncle, Jang Sung-taek, who managed the project before his execution in 2013. In 2016,  satellite imagery showed that the park had been demolished.

See also 
 List of amusement parks in North Korea

Notes

External links 
 Inside North Korea's Miniature City: Folklore Park, ABC News,13 October 2015.

Amusement parks in Pyongyang
Defunct amusement parks
2012 establishments in North Korea
Amusement parks opened in 2012